Virados do Avesso is a 2014 Portuguese comedy film directed by Edgar Pêra. It was released on 27 November 2014.

Cast
Diogo Morgado
Nicolau Breyner
Rui Unas
Nuno Melo
Rui Melo

Reception
As of 11 January 2015, it was the second highest-grossing Portuguese film of 2014 at the Portuguese box office, with €550,441.04, and also the second with most admissions, with 106,736. Also, as of 14 January 2015, it was the 10th highest-grossing Portuguese film at the Portuguese box office since 2004, with €573,149.88, and the 11th with most admissions, with 111,144.

On Público, Jorge Mourinha gave the film a grade of "mediocre".

References

External links

2014 comedy films
Portuguese comedy films
Films directed by Edgar Pêra